The 1928 Loyola Wolf Pack football team was an American football team that represented Loyola College of New Orleans (now known as Loyola University New Orleans) as an independent during the 1928 college football season. In its second season under head coach Clark Shaughnessy, the team compiled a 7–3 record and outscored opponents by a total of 220 to 85. The team played its home games at Loyola University Stadium in New Orleans.

Schedule

References

Loyola
Loyola Wolf Pack football seasons
Loyola Wolf Pack football